Bakerolimon is a genus of flowering plants belonging to the family Plumbaginaceae.

Its native range is Peru to North Chile.

Species:

Bakerolimon peruvianum 
Bakerolimon plumosum

References

Plumbaginaceae
Caryophyllales genera